Savithiri may refer to:

 Savithiri (1941 film), a 1941 Tamil language film
 Savithiri (1980 film), a 1980 Tamil language film

It is also an Indian given name. Notable people with the name include:
 Savithri Lakshmanan, an Indian National Congress politician
 Savithiri Shanmugam (1913 - ?), an Indian National Congress politician